Mustpank is one of the Vaika islands belonging to the country of Estonia.

See also
 List of islands of Estonia

Islands of Estonia